Sir Robert Carminowe Michell  (2 September 1876 – 22 January 1956) was a British diplomat who was minister to Bolivia and Uruguay and ambassador to Chile.

Career
Michell was educated at the former Bath College. After military service during the South African War he entered the Diplomatic Service and was posted to be Vice-Consul at Kertch followed by similar posts at Rotterdam in 1908 and at Nyborg in 1912. The next year he was promoted to be consul in Nicaragua. He was Second Secretary in the British Legation at Santiago, Chile, 1915–1921 and chargé d'affaires in Montevideo 1921–1922. Until 1926 he was Consul-General and chargé d'affaires in Ecuador. He was then appointed Minister to Bolivia 1926–30, Minister to Uruguay 1930–33 and Ambassador to Chile 1933–36. He then retired from the Diplomatic Service and lived in Chile until his death there in 1956.

Michell was knighted KCMG in 1933 at the end of his service in Uruguay.

Family
In 1903 Robert Michell married Ethel Michell (his third cousin). They had a daughter and a son but she died in 1908, shortly after the birth of her son. In 1916 he married Margarita Gana, daughter of Don Domingo Gana who had been Chilean minister to the United Kingdom. They had a son; she died a few months after him in 1956.

Offices held

Notes

References 
MICHELL, Sir Robert Carminowe, Who Was Who, A & C Black, 1920–2016 (online edition, Oxford University Press, 2014)
Sir Robert Carminowe MICHELL, Knt. KCMG – Devon Mitchells web-site
Obituary – Sir Robert Michell, The Times, London, 24 January 1956, page 11

1876 births
1956 deaths
British military personnel of the Second Boer War
Ambassadors of the United Kingdom to Bolivia
Ambassadors of the United Kingdom to Uruguay
Ambassadors of the United Kingdom to Chile
Knights Commander of the Order of St Michael and St George